Last Pair Out, is a 1956 Swedish drama film directed by Alf Sjöberg and written by Ingmar Bergman. It was entered into the 7th Berlin International Film Festival.

Cast
 Eva Dahlbeck as Susanna Dahlin
 Harriet Andersson as Anita
 Bibi Andersson as Kerstin
 Björn Bjelfvenstam as Bo Dahlin 
 Jarl Kulle as Dr. Farell
 Olof Widgren as Hans Dahlin
 Aino Taube as Kerstin's mother
 Hugo Björne as Professor Jacobi
 Jan-Olof Strandberg as Claes Berg
 Märta Arbin as Grandmother
 Jullan Kindahl as Alma

References

External links
 

1956 films
1950s Swedish-language films
Swedish black-and-white films
1956 drama films
Films directed by Alf Sjöberg
Films with screenplays by Ingmar Bergman
1950s Swedish films
Swedish drama films